Russ Gershon (born August 11, 1959) is an American saxophonist, composer, arranger, and founder of the Either/Orchestra in Massachusetts in 1985.

Career
Gershon founded Accurate Records, which has released albums by Morphine, Medeski Martin & Wood, the Alloy Orchestra, Ghost Train Orchestra, the Either/Orchestra, Dominique Eade, and Garrison Fewell. He has been a member of rock bands the Decoders (1980–82), the Sex Execs (1982–84), Hypnosonics (1986–1999), Orchestra Morphine (2000–present) Bourbon Princess (2003–2008). He has worked as a studio musician and has performed in Boston.

In 1997, Gershon played arrangements of Ethiopian popular music with the Either/Orchestra. This drew the attention of Francis Falceto, who produced the "Éthiopiques" series of albums to document 20th century Ethiopian music. Through Falceto's connections, Gershon and his band were invited to Addis Ababa in 2004 and became the first American big band to perform in Ethiopia since Duke Ellington's in 1973. Their principal concert was released as the album Ethiopiques 20: Live in Addis and led to working with Ethiopian musicians such as Mulatu Astatke, Mahmoud Ahmed, Getachew Mekurya, Alemayehu Eshete and Teshome Mitiku. In 2016 Gershon appeared with Ahmed's band at Carnegie Hall.

Awards and honors
Grammy Award nomination, Best Original Arrangement of an Instrumental Composition, "Bennie Moten's Weird Nightmare"

Discography

As leader
With Either/Orchestra
 Dial E (Accurate, 1986)
 Radium (Accurate, 1988)
 The Half-Life of Desire (Accurate, 1990)
 The Calculus of Pleasure (Accurate, 1992)
 The Brunt (Accurate, 1994)
 Across the Omniverse (Accurate, 1996)
 More Beautiful Than Death (Accurate, 2000)
 Afro-Cubism (Hot, 2002)
 Neo-Modernism (Accurate, 2003)
 Ethiopiques 20: Live in Addis (Buda Musique, 2004)

As sideman
With Morphine
 B-Sides and Otherwise (Rykodisc, 1997)
 Early to Bed (Rykodisc, 1997)
 Potion (Rykodisc, 1997)

With others
 Mulatu Astatke, Mulatu Steps Ahead (Strut, 2010)
 Concussion Ensemble, Stampede (Conc, 1993)
 Bob Merrill, Cheerin' Up the Universe (Accurate, 2015)
 Mark Sandman, Sandbox (Hi-n-Dry, 2004)
 Laurie Sargent, Little Dipper and the Shooting Star (Hi-n-Dry, 2013)
 Throwing Muses, Hunkpapa (4AD, 1989)
 Twinemen, Twinemen (Hi-n-Dry, 2002)

References

All About Jazz, October 27, 2003 - Either/Orchestra Handles All Tough Turns of Jazz Road
Jazz Review 

1959 births
Living people
Musicians from Massachusetts
21st-century American composers
21st-century American male musicians
21st-century American saxophonists
American male composers
American male saxophonists
American music industry executives
Avant-garde jazz musicians
American male jazz musicians